Martin Dorbek (born 21 January 1991) is an Estonian professional basketball player. He is currently playing for BC Kalev/Cramo. He comes from basketball family: father Allan Dorbek is a basketball coach, brothers Erik Dorbek and Karl-Peeter Dorbek are both Estonian champions. Another basketball player Gert Dorbek is Allan's uncle's descendant.

Club career

Martin Dorbek started his basketball career in BC Kalev/Cramo youth system and went on to make his debut in Korvpalli Meistriliiga at the age of 17 with Kuremaa SK. After a season with bottom-finished club he rejoined BC Kalev/Cramo, but played only episodic role in their disappointing third place appearance in the 2009-2010 KML season.
Since 2010 he has been playing for BC Rakvere Tarvas, with whom he reached the Estonian Cup and Baltic League Challenge Cup finals in 2011 and 2012, respectively and claimed his second KML bronze medal in addition to personal achievements as he was chosen to the All-KML Defensive teams two years in a row.

BC Kalev/Cramo
On June 18, 2012 it was announced that Dorbek will return from a loan spell and play for BC Kalev/Cramo.

International career

In 2011, after successful breakthrough season he was included in the shortlist of Estonia national basketball team and also Estonian U20 team. With the latter, they managed to get promoted to the FIBA Europe Under-20 Championship A division, defeating Belgium U20 on their way to the final, only to lose to strong Georgian team.

Honours

Club
Korvpalli Meistriliiga: 2015–16, 2016–17, 2017–18, 2018–19
Estonian Basketball Cup: 2015, 2016, 2020

Individual
 KML Best Defender: 2013

Career statistics

Domestic leagues

References

External links
 Profile at basket.ee
 Profile at bbl.net
 Profile at bctarvas.ee

1991 births
Living people
BC Kalev/Cramo players
Estonian men's basketball players
Korvpalli Meistriliiga players
Basketball players at the 2015 European Games
European Games competitors for Estonia
Rapla KK players
BC Rakvere Tarvas players
Basketball players from Tallinn
Guards (basketball)